Cortland Fire Headquarters is a historic fire station located at Cortland in Cortland County, New York.  It is a three-story, predominantly rectangular structure, consisting of stepped gables, square bell tower, yellow faced brick, and tiled roof, built in 1914.  The first floor houses fire apparatus, the second serves as quarters for firefighters, and the third is a meeting hall and training area, as well as the home for the special operations division.

It was listed on the National Register of Historic Places in 1974.

References

Fire stations on the National Register of Historic Places in New York (state)
Fire stations completed in 1914
Buildings and structures in Cortland County, New York
National Register of Historic Places in Cortland County, New York